Odvardt Helmoldt von Lode, also Odvardt Helmoldt de Lode (c. 1726 – 3 September 1757), was a Danish painter and engraver.

Early life
Lode was the son of the painter and engraver Gustav de Lode. He followed in his father's footsteps and became a painter in Viborg and later in Copenhagen and was first mentioned in documents in 1742. From 1743 on there were articles about him and his work in several magazines.

Works
In 1745 he painted the frontispiece in Altona, Hamburg. He also engraved a series of portraits of notable people, including Tycho Brahe, Adam Gottlob Moltke, Ole Worm, Peter Tordenskjold, Ludvig Holberg (1752) and Johan Ludvig Holstein-Ledreborg (1757).

Later life
In 1754 he married a wine merchant's daughter, Karen Nordrup. In 1755 he was awarded the Academy's silver medal. He was then commissioned to engrave the twelve Oldenburg kings. He completed Christian I of Denmark in 1757, but died the same year. His widow died in 1763.

References 
 Odvardt Helmoldt von Lode at the Art Index Denmark / Weilbachs Artist Encyclopedia

External Links 
 MyNDIR (My Norse Digital Image repository) illustrations by Odvardt Helmoldt von Lode from Monuments de la mythologie et de la poésie des Celtes. Clicking on the thumbnail will give you the full image and information concerning it.

1726 births
1757 deaths
18th-century Danish engravers
18th-century Danish painters
18th-century male artists
Danish male painters